The Mount Suhora Observatory is an astronomical observatory owned and operated by the Astronomy department of the Pedagogical University of Cracow. It is located on Mount Suhora in the Gorce Mountains within the Gorce National Park, 50 km south of Kraków.

History
Founded on November 5, 1987, Mt. Suhora Observatory serves a dual purpose. It is meant as a place of learning for students of the University's Astronomy department from Kraków as well as the research-work facility. The observatory has one 0.6 metre Cassegrain telescope along with a photometer and a CCD camera.

Gallery

References

Mt. Suhora Observatory home page.

Suhora
Limanowa County
Buildings and structures in Lesser Poland Voivodeship